The thirteenth season of the television series Dallas aired on CBS during the 1989–90 TV season.

Cast

Starring
In alphabetical order:
 Barbara Bel Geddes as Miss Ellie Ewing Farlow (19 episodes)
 Lesley-Anne Down as Stephanie Rogers (8 episodes)
 Patrick Duffy as Bobby Ewing (26 episodes)
 Kimberly Foster as Michelle Stevens (21 episodes)
 Larry Hagman as J.R. Ewing (27 episodes)
 Howard Keel as Clayton Farlow (20 episodes)
 George Kennedy as Carter McKay (26 episodes)
 Ken Kercheval as Cliff Barnes (23 episodes)
 Sasha Mitchell as James Beaumont (23 episodes)
 Cathy Podewell as Cally Harper Ewing (25 episodes)
 Charlene Tilton as Lucy Ewing Cooper (17 episodes)
 Sheree J. Wilson as April Stevens (24 episodes)

Also Starring
 Alexis Smith as Lady Jessica Montford (4 episodes)
 Karen Kopins as Kay Lloyd (3 episodes)
 Denver Pyle as Blackie Callahan (2 episodes)
 Audrey Landers as Afton Cooper Van Buren (1 episode)
 Beth Toussaint as Tracey Lawton (1 episode)

Notable guest stars
Gayle Hunnicutt (Vanessa Beaumont) appears in three episodes, as does Barbara Stock (Liz Adams). Michael Wilding (Alex Barton) appears in a major story-arc, although he doesn't return for the final season. Leslie Bevis (Diana Farrington) also appears in a major arc, and returns in the final episode as a different character. Margaret Michaels, who played Pamela Barnes Ewing for a season 12 episode, returns as a different character, Jeanne O'Brien, for four episodes. Claude Earl Jones appears in two episodes as Duke Carlisle, a character who will return for the final season, recast with Clifton James in an "also starring" capacity.

DVD release
The thirteenth season of Dallas was released by Warner Bros. Home Video, on a Region 1 DVD box set of three double-sided DVDs, on April 13, 2010. Like the other DVD sets of the show's last five seasons, it does not include any extras, besides the 27 episodes.

Episodes

References

General references

External links 

1989 American television seasons
1990 American television seasons
Dallas (1978 TV series) seasons